Art Sqool is an art game developed by Julian Glander. It was released on February 5, 2019, for Microsoft Windows and MacOS, and on November 19, 2020, for Nintendo Switch. The game received negative reviews, citing a lack of depth, but was praised for its art style and elements of surrealism.

Gameplay 
The game follows "Froshmin", an art student whose work is judged by a "neural network" serving as their professor. Players are provided a prompt by the professor and asked to create artwork matching this prompt. The artwork is then "graded" by the professor, though the resulting grade and score is randomised. Froshmin can collect additional brushes and colors by exploring the campus.

Development 
Glander developed the game using Unity, though hired developers as needed. Speaking to Game Developer, Glander explained that he set out to create "a gentle [Grand Theft Auto]", with the creation of art as the primary aspect of gameplay. The setting and art style was inspired by Super Monkey Ball and mini golf courses, while the gameplay mechanic took inspiration from Kid Pix. While Glander did not attend art school themselves, the game includes prompts based on genuine art school tasks. Glander also produced the soundtrack to the game, making use of automated drum patterns and synthesizers generated by GarageBand, in addition to a vocaloid.

Reception 
Art Sqool received "generally unfavorable reviews" according to Metacritic.

Criticism focused on the game's lack of depth and randomised grading system. John Walker of Rock Paper Shotgun called it "a tiresome chore to play through" and encouraged prospective players to use Microsoft Paint instead. Some reviewers, however, praised its art style and surrealist nature, and others noted its commentary on arts education.

References 

2019 video games
Art games
Indie video games
Windows games
MacOS games
Nintendo Switch games
Single-player video games
Drawing video games
Parody video games
Video games developed in the United States